Linda Kaufman George (born 1947) is an American sociologist and gerontologist who is the Arts and Sciences Distinguished Professor of Sociology at Duke University. Her research focuses on the sociology of mental health, physical health, and aging, among other topics. She was president of the Gerontological Society of America from November 1993 to October 1994, and she received the Leonard I. Pearlin Award for Distinguished Contributions to the Sociological Study of Mental Health from the American Sociological Association in 2013.

References

External links
Faculty page

Living people
American women sociologists
American gerontologists
20th-century American women scientists
Miami University alumni
21st-century American women scientists
Duke University alumni
Duke University faculty
1947 births
People from Wadsworth, Ohio
20th-century social scientists
21st-century social scientists
Scientists from Ohio